The West African Bankers' Association (WABA) is a professional association of banking and financial services and institutions in West Africa.

It has its headquarters and offices in Benin, Burkina Faso, Cape Verde, Gambia, Ghana, Guinea, Guinea-Bissau, Ivory Coast, Liberia, Mali, Niger, Nigeria, Senegal, Sierra Leone, and Togo.

History
The WABA was created on August 10, 1981 with the main purpose of supporting and developing the West African Clearing House (WACH).

Membership and organization

The organization has banking, securities, and auditing institutions, and individual members. The secretary general is Sega Balde, with Rev Ifeanyi IWANDE  as president.

The central banks of each participating countries financed the association. The WABA serves as an intermediary between banks and the sub-regional committee of the central banks.

The association is located in Freetown, Sierra Leone.

See also

Banque Capitale du Benin
Banque Internationale du Bénin
Central Bank of West African States
Economic Community of West African States
Financial Bank Benin associated with phone number+229)62057804
Yaw Osafo-Marfo

References

External links

Banking in Ghana
Bankers associations
Banks of Benin
International organizations based in Africa
Organizations with year of establishment missing